The ICC Men's Test Team Rankings (formerly known as the ICC Test Championship) is an international rankings system of the International Cricket Council for the 12 teams that play Test cricket (though Afghanistan and Ireland are not currently ranked as they have not played enough matches recently). The rankings are based on international matches that are otherwise played as part of regular Test cricket scheduling, with no consideration of home or away status.

After every Test series, the two teams involved receive points based on a mathematical formula involving both teams' previous rating and the result of the series. Each team's points total from matches over the last 3–4 years is divided by a figure based on their total number of matches and series played, to give a "rating".

A drawn match between higher and lower rated teams will benefit the lower-rated team at the expense of the higher-rated team. An "average" team that wins as often as it loses, while playing a mix of stronger and weaker teams, will have a rating of 100.

The top ranked Test team was previously awarded the ICC Test Championship mace, until the inauguration of ICC World Test Championship. From 2002 to 2019, the mace was transferred whenever a new team moved to the top of the rating list. The team that was top of the ratings table on 1 April each year also won a cash prize.

Australia is currently the highest-ranked team in the rankings, as of an update published in January 2022.

Current rankings

Historical rankings
The ICC provides ratings for the end of each month back to June 2003. The teams that have successively held the highest rating since that date, by whole month periods are:

The summary of teams that have held the highest rating from June 2003 to the present by whole month periods are:

Since the ICC officially began ranking teams in 2003, Australia had dominated the rankings table. However, from 2009, several teams (Australia, South Africa, India, England, New Zealand, and Pakistan) have competed for the top positions. 

The ICC retrospectively applied the current rating system to results since 1952 (providing ratings for the end of each month from then). The table only begins then, as prior to 1952 there is insufficient data available due to the infrequency of matches and the small number of competing teams in these earlier periods.

The teams that have successively held the highest rating from January 1952 until May 2003, by whole month periods are:

The summary of teams that have held the highest rating from 1952 to the present by whole month periods are:

ICC Test Championship (2002–2019)
The rankings system was called ICC Test Championship, until the inauguration of ICC World Test Championship in 2019. From 2002 to 2019, the top-ranked Test team was awarded with the ICC Test Championship mace and the top team at each April 1 cut-off (until 2019) was also awarded a cash prize, the winners of which are listed below. The mace is now awarded to the winners of the ICC World Test Championship.

Calculations 
Each team scores points based on the results of their matches over the last 3–4 years. A series must include at least two Tests.

The rankings table gives the total points from all series played in the 12–24 months since the May before last, plus all the series played in the 24 months before that, for which the matches played and points earned both count half. Each May, the matches and points earned between 3 and 4 years ago are removed, and the matches and points earned between 1 and 2 years ago switch from 100% weighting to 50% weighting. For example, at May 2014, the matches played between May 2010 and May 2011 were removed, and the matches played between May 2012 and May 2013 switched to 50% weighting. This happens overnight, so can result in teams changing positions in the ranking table despite no one playing.

Each time two teams complete another series, the rankings tables is updated as described below, based on the ratings of the teams immediately before they played.

Step 1. Find the series points for each team

 Award 1 point to a team for each match won.
 Award  point to a team for each match drawn or tied.
 Award 1 bonus point to the team winning the series.
 Award  bonus point to each team if the series is drawn.

Step 2. Convert these series points to actual ratings points

If the gap between the ratings of the two teams before the series was less than 40 points

The ratings points for each team equals:

As each match won earns a team 1 series point and their opponent 0, losing earns them 0 series points and their opponent 1, and drawing earns both teams  series point, each match played therefore earns teams ratings points as follows:

As this formula only applies when the gap between the ratings of the two teams at the start of the series was less than 40 points, winning a match will always earn a team more rating points than the rating they already had, and losing a match will always earn a team fewer rating points than the rating they already had. Drawing a match will earn the weaker team more rating points than the rating they already had, and the stronger team fewer.

The difference between winning and losing a single match is therefore 100 points. Also, whether the outcome of a match is a win & lose or a draw, the total rating points earned by the two teams from that match will be the sum of the two teams' ratings before the series began. The total rating points earned from a series will therefore equal the sum of the two teams' ratings before the series began multiplied by (the number of matches + 1).

If the gap between the ratings of the two teams before the series was at least 40 points

The ratings points for the stronger team equals:

and the ratings points for the weaker team equals:

As above, each match played therefore earns teams ratings points as follows:

Therefore, again, winning a match will always earn a team more rating points than the rating they already had, and losing a match will always earn a team fewer rating points than the rating they already had. Drawing a match will earn the weaker team more points than the rating they already had, and the stronger team fewer.

For both teams, the difference between winning and losing a single match is still 100 points. Also, whichever of the three outcomes happens, the total rating points earned by the two teams from that match will be the sum of the two teams' ratings before the series began.

Step 3. Update the ranking table

For each team:
Add the ratings points scored to their total ratings points already scored (in previous matches).
Update the number of matches played by adding the number of Series points available. This is one more than the number of games in the series, as there is an additional point available for the series winner (a two Test match series will result in the match count getting incremented by three).
Divide the new rating points total by the updated number of matches to get the updated Rating.

Example

Suppose two teams, initially with ratings of 120 and 90, play a 3-match series, and the team with the higher initial rating wins 2–1:

The total Ratings points available from the series (460+380=840) is the same as the initial ratings of the teams multiplied by the number of Series points available ((120+90)x4=840).
The two teams' total ratings is almost exactly the same after the series (119.4+90.5=209.9) as before the series (120+90=210). The series has therefore not generated any extra ratings, but has just redistributed the ratings the two teams already had. When these ratings are published in the official table in their rounded form (119 and 91), the total ratings after the series will be exactly the same as before the series. There is therefore no points 'inflation' in this system, which means that comparisons of ratings over time are meaningful.
Despite winning the series, Team A's rating has reduced, and despite losing the series, Team B's rating has increased. If Team A had won the series 3–0 then its rating would have increased to 122.4.

See also

ICC Men's ODI Team Rankings
ICC Men's T20I Team Rankings

References

External links
ICC Men's Test Team Rankings

Men's Test Team Rankings
Sports world rankings